, also known as  was the eighth legendary emperor of Japan, according to the traditional order of succession. Very little is known about this Emperor due to a lack of material available for further verification and study. Kōgen is known as a "legendary emperor" among historians as his actual existence is disputed. Nothing exists in the Kojiki other than his name and genealogy. Kōgen's reign allegedly began in 214 BC, he had one wife and two consorts whom he fathered six children with. After his death in 158 BC, one of his sons supposedly became Emperor Kaika.

Legendary narrative
In the Kojiki and Nihon Shoki, only Kōgen's name and genealogy were recorded. The Japanese have traditionally accepted this sovereign's historical existence, and an Imperial misasagi or tomb for Kōgen is currently maintained; however, no extant contemporary records have been discovered that confirm a view that this historical figure actually reigned. Kōgen was born sometime in 273 BC, and is recorded as being the eldest son of Emperor Kōrei. His empress mother was named "Kuwashi-hime", who was the daughter of Shiki no Agatanushi Oome. Before he was enthroned sometime in 214 BC, his pre-ascension name was Prince Ō-yamato-neko-hiko-kuni-kuru no Mikoto. Emperor Kōgen had a chief wife (empress) named Utsushikome, along with two consorts. His first son was named Prince Ōhiko, and according to the Nihon Shoki was the direct ancestor of the Abe clan. One of Kōgen's other sons, Prince Hikofutsuoshinomakoto, was also the grandfather of the legendary Japanese hero-statesman Takenouchi no Sukune. Emperor Kōgen reigned until his death in 158 BC; his second son was then enthroned as the next emperor.

Known information
The existence of at least the first nine Emperors is disputed due to insufficient material available for further verification and study. Kōgen is thus regarded by historians as a "legendary Emperor", and is considered to have been the seventh of eight Emperors without specific legends associated with them. The name Kōgen-tennō was assigned to him posthumously by later generations. His name might have been regularized centuries after the lifetime ascribed to Kōgen, possibly during the time in which legends about the origins of the Yamato dynasty were compiled as the chronicles known today as the Kojiki. While the actual site of Kōgen's grave is not known, the Emperor is traditionally venerated at a memorial Shinto shrine (misasagi) in Kashihara. The Imperial Household Agency designates this location as Kōgen's mausoleum, and its formal name is Tsurugi no ike no shima no e no misasagi.

The first emperor that historians state might have actually existed is Emperor Sujin, the 10th emperor of Japan. Outside of the Kojiki, the reign of Emperor Kinmei ( – 571 AD) is the first for which contemporary historiography is able to assign verifiable dates. The conventionally accepted names and dates of the early Emperors were not confirmed as "traditional" though, until the reign of Emperor Kanmu between 737 and 806 AD.

Consorts and children
Empress: , Oyakuchisukune's daughter
, ancestor of all the Abe clan's descendants.

, later Emperor Kaika.

Consort: , Ōhesoki's daughter
Consort: , Kawachi-no-Aotamakake's daughter

See also
 Emperor of Japan
 List of Emperors of Japan
 Imperial cult

Notes

References

Further reading
 Asakawa, Kan'ichi. (1903).   The Early Institutional Life of Japan. Tokyo: Shueisha.  ;  see online, multi-formatted, full-text book at openlibrary.org
 Aston, William. (1896).  Nihongi: Chronicles of Japan from the Earliest Times to A.D. 697. London: Kegan Paul, Trench, Trubner.  
 Brown, Delmer M. and Ichirō Ishida, eds. (1979).  Gukanshō: The Future and the Past. Berkeley: University of California Press. ;  
 Chamberlain, Basil Hall. (1920). The Kojiki. Read before the Asiatic Society of Japan on April 12, May 10, and June 21, 1882; reprinted, May, 1919.  
 Nussbaum, Louis-Frédéric and Käthe Roth. (2005).  Japan encyclopedia. Cambridge: Harvard University Press. ;  
 Ponsonby-Fane, Richard Arthur Brabazon. (1959).  The Imperial House of Japan. Kyoto: Ponsonby Memorial Society. 
 Titsingh, Isaac. (1834). Nihon Ōdai Ichiran; ou,  Annales des empereurs du Japon.  Paris: Royal Asiatic Society, Oriental Translation Fund of Great Britain and Ireland.  
 Varley, H. Paul. (1980).  Jinnō Shōtōki: A Chronicle of Gods and Sovereigns. New York: Columbia University Press. ;  

 
 

Legendary Emperors of Japan
2nd-century BC rulers in Asia
People of Yayoi-period Japan